Valkyrie is an American doom metal band from Harrisonburg, Virginia.

Biography
Driven by brothers Jake and Pete Adams, Valkyrie draws from pre-metal style to create a stoner metal sound. They formed in summer 2002 as a three-piece consisting of vocalist/guitarist Jake Adams, bassist Eric Seaman, and drummer Luke Shafer. In 2004 Jake's brother Pete was introduced on second guitar and a five-song demo was recorded at a local college radio station. Shafer soon departed and was replaced by Mike Hoke on drums and a new demo, Sunlight Shines, and a split 7-inch with VOG were recorded. Seaman and Hoke parted ways with the band at the end of 2004 and were replaced by bassist Nick Crabill and drummer Nic McInturff. This line-up recorded the eponymous debut album, which was released by Twin Earth Records. In early 2006 Valkyrie again parted ways with its rhythm section and recruited current bassist Will Barry-Rec and drummer Gary Isom (Spirit Caravan, Pentagram). Isom and Valkyrie parted ways in mid-2007 and Valkyrie recruited drummer Warren Hawkins.

Members
Current members
Jake Adams - guitar, vocals (2002–present)
Pete Adams - guitar, vocals (2004–present)
Alan Fary - bass (2012–present)
Warren Hawkins - drums (2007–present)

Former members
Eric Seaman - bass (2002-2004)
Luke Shafer - drums (2002-2004)
Mike Hoke - drums (2004)
Nick Crabill - bass (2004-2006)
Nic McInturff - drums (2004-2006)
Gary Isom - drums (2006-2007)
Will Barry-Rec - bass (2006-2012)

Discography
 Split 7-inch with VOG (2005 self-released)
 Valkyrie (2006 Twin Earth Records)
 Split 7-inch with Bible of the Devil (2008 Heavy Birth), red and blue vinyl
 Man of Two Visions (2010 Noble Origin)
 Valkyrie/Earthling split 7-inch (2012 Tension Head Records)
 Shadows (2015 Relapse Records)
 Fear (2020 Relapse Records)

References

External links
Official Valkyrie Page
Official Facebook Page

American doom metal musical groups
Heavy metal musical groups from Virginia
Musical groups established in 2002
Musical quartets
2002 establishments in Virginia